Mickleover Football Club is a football club based in the Mickleover suburb of Derby, Derbyshire, England. The club were formed as Mickleover Old Boys in 1948, before becoming Mickleover Sports in the 1990s. In 2020 the club dropped "Sports" from its name.

History
The club was established in 1948 as Mickleover Old Boys. They joined the Derby & District Senior League, where they played until moving up to the Premier Division of the Central Midlands League after relocating to the Station Road ground. The club was then renamed Mickleover Sports. A fourth-place finish in the Premier Division in 1994–95 saw them promoted to the Supreme Division. In 1998–99 they were Supreme Division champions, earning promotion to Division One of the Northern Counties East League. The club went on to win Division One and the league's Trophy in 2002–03 and were promoted to the Premier Division.

The 2006–07 season saw Mickleover win the League Cup, beating Garforth Town in the final on penalties. In 2008–09 they were Premier Division champions, earning promotion to Division One South of the Northern Premier League. The club went on to win Division One South the following season, securing a second successive promotion, this time to the Premier Division of the Northern Premier League. They also won the league's Chairman's Cup with a win over Halifax Town. However, the club were relegated back to Division One South at the end of the 2011–12 season. A fifth-place finish in 2013–14 saw them qualify for the promotion play-offs. After beating Coalville Town 3–2 in the semi-finals, they lost the final 1–0 to Belper Town.

Following their play-off final defeat, Mickleover went on to win Division One South the following season, earning promotion back to the Premier Division. On 1 June 2020 they were renamed Mickleover F.C..

Ground
The club play at the Mickleover Sports Ground. Plans to develop the ground began in 1982, although work did not start until 1992. The new ground opened in 1993.

Current squad

Management and coaching staff

Boardroom

Current staff

Managerial history

Honours
Northern Premier League
Division One South champions 2009–10, 2014–15
Chairman's Cup winners 2009–10
Northern Counties East League
Premier Division champions 2008–09
Division One champions 2002–03
League Cup winners 2006–07
Trophy winners 2002–03
Central Midlands League
Supreme Division champions 1998–99

Records
Best FA Cup performance: Third qualifying round, 2010–11, 2014–15, 2018–19, 2020–21
Best FA Trophy performance: First round, 2020–21
Best FA Vase performance: Fourth round, 2000–01

See also
Mickleover Sports F.C. players
Mickleover Sports F.C. managers

References

External links

 
Football clubs in England
Sport in Derby
1948 establishments in England
Association football clubs established in 1948
Central Midlands Football League
Northern Counties East Football League
Northern Premier League clubs
Football clubs in Derbyshire